The 1996–97 Calgary Flames season was the 17th National Hockey League season in Calgary.  It was another season of decline, as the Flames began the rebuilding process after remaining near the top of the league standings for nearly a decade.  Finishing 5th in the Pacific Division, the Flames missed the playoffs for the first time since 1992, and for only the second time since coming to Calgary.

As a result of missing the playoffs, the Flames fired head coach Pierre Page following the season, replacing him with Brian Sutter.  Page ended his Flames career with a coaching record of 66–78–20.  His .463 winning percentage was, at the time, the worst for any coach in Flames history.

On November 23, 1996, rugged forward Sasha Lakovic authored one of the more memorable moments in the history of the Battle of Alberta when he attempted to leap over the glass at Northlands Coliseum in Edmonton to attack a drunken fan who had reached over the barrier to dump a beer on the head of Flames assistant coach Guy Lapointe.  Lakovic, who was held back by his teammates from going into the crowd, was suspended two games, while the Edmonton Oilers were fined $20,000 for having inadequate security.

Theoren Fleury was named to the Western Conference team at the 47th National Hockey League All-Star Game, where he recorded an assist.

Rookie forward Jarome Iginla, acquired the previous season in a trade for Joe Nieuwendyk led all NHL rookies in scoring at 50 points.  Despite his success, Iginla failed to win the Calder Memorial Trophy, as defenceman Bryan Berard was voted the league's top rookie.  Iginla was named to the All-Rookie team, however.

Regular season

The Flames allowed the most shorthanded goals in the league in 1996–97, with 19.

Season standings

Schedule and results

Player statistics

Skaters
Note: GP = Games played; G = Goals; A = Assists; Pts = Points; PIM = Penalty minutes

†Denotes player spent time with another team before joining Calgary.  Stats reflect time with the Flames only.

Goaltenders
Note: GP = Games played; TOI = Time on ice (minutes); W = Wins; L = Losses; OT = Overtime/shootout losses; GA = Goals against; SO = Shutouts; GAA = Goals against average

‡Traded mid-season

Transactions
The Flames were involved in the following transactions during the 1996–97 season.

Trades

Free agents

Draft picks

Calgary's picks at the 1996 NHL Entry Draft, held in St. Louis, Missouri.

Farm teams

Saint John Flames
The Baby Flames finished the 1996–97 American Hockey League season in second place in the Canadian Division with a 28–36–13–3 record.  They were defeated in three games to two by the Hamilton Bulldogs in the first round of the playoffs, however.  Jarrod Skalde led the Flames with 32 goals and 68 points. Darrin Madeley was the starting goaltender, posting an 11–18–11 record with a 3.21 GAA in 46 games.

See also
1996–97 NHL season

References

Player stats: 2006–07 Calgary Flames Media Guide, pg 115
Game log: 1996–97 Calgary Flames game log, usatoday.com, accessed January 21, 2007
Team standings:  1996–97 NHL standings @hockeydb.com
Trades: hockeydb.com player pages

Calgary Flames seasons
Calgary Flames season, 1996-97
Calg